This article contains a list of fossil-bearing stratigraphic units in the state of Wyoming, U.S.

Sites

See also

 Paleontology in Wyoming

References

 

Wyoming
Stratigraphic units

Wyoming geography-related lists
United States geology-related lists